Eurobahn is a railway operator in Germany, established in 1998. It operates regional train services in the state of North Rhine-Westphalia, with cross-border services including Lower Saxony and the Netherlands.

Initially a joint venture between Keolis and Rhenus operating bus and rail services, it became a 100% Keolis subsidiary operating rail services only in 2007. Since 1 January 2022, it is owned by the law firm Noerr.

History

Company history

Eurobahn was founded in 1998 as a 60/40 joint venture between Keolis and Rhenus.

In December 2007, the joint venture was dissolved; Rhenus taking ownership of the bus operations and two railway contracts, Keolis taking full ownership of Eurobahn.

In October 2021, Keolis announced its intention to sell the business and exit the German market. The business was sold to Team Treuhand, a subsidiary of Noerr law firm, effective 31 December 2021.

Rail services
In May 2000, Eurobahn commenced operating two rail services in the East Westphalia-Lippe region (OWL) in North Rhine-Westphalia. In 2013 the OWL contract was renewed until December 2025 with an additional two routes added. 

On 14 December 2008, Eurobahn commenced operating the Hellweg Net services. In 2015, the contract was extended until 2030.

In December 2009, Eurobahn commenced operating the Maas-Rhine-Lippe network.

In December 2017, Eurobahn commenced operating the Teutoburger Wald network.

Eurobahn was scheduled to commence operating Rhine-Ruhr S-Bahn routes S1 and S4 under contract to Verkehrsverbund Rhein-Ruhr (VRR) in December 2019. However with Eurobahn unable to recruit enough drivers before the contract commenced, VRR cancelled the contract with incumbent DB Regio awarded a short-term contract instead.

Services
Eurobahn operate services on the following lines:

Current

Former
Eurobahn formerly operated the following services:

Rolling stock
The Eurobahn fleet consists of Bombardier Talents and Stadler Flirts.

References

External links

Keolis
Railway companies of Germany
Railway companies established in 1998
1998 establishments in Germany